"Only Women Bleed" is a song by Alice Cooper, released on his debut solo album Welcome to My Nightmare in 1975. It was written by Cooper and Dick Wagner, and was the second single from the album to be released.

Background
It is a ballad about a woman in an abusive marriage. The song is often mistakenly presumed to be about  menstruation, and that has limited its play on radio and in other public forums. As a single by Cooper, it was released as just "Only Women".

Prior to the release of Welcome to My Nightmare in the US, a shortened version of the song was released as a single and was alternatively titled "Only Women" by Atlantic Records due to protests by feminist groups. The album version of the song features more orchestral movements than the single, and also runs longer than the 45 at 5:49.

According to co-writer Dick Wagner, the song's musical riff and vocal melody were developed several years earlier during his tenure with the late-1960s Michigan-based band the Frost, but Wagner had never liked his lyrics and the song was never recorded. He played the riff for Cooper, and the two developed new lyrics for the eventual Welcome to My Nightmare recording.

Critical reception
Billboard staff responded warmly to this single. The lyric of it was described as "stunning". Record World called it "a ballad with a surprisingly international flavor" and said that "Alice's new sound should prove a soft touch for reaching his widest audience yet!"

Chart performance
It is one of Cooper's biggest hits, reaching number 1 on the Canadian RPM national singles chart and number 12 on the US Billboard Hot 100 singles chart in 1975. It is from his album Welcome to My Nightmare. It was the first of several ballad releases by Cooper that reached the top 20 of the Hot 100 singles chart.

Weekly charts

Year-end charts

Julie Covington version
Julie Covington's cover of the song reached #12 on the UK charts when it was released as a single. It was later included on the 2000 re-release of her eponymous 1978 album

Other covers
Other covers include Guns 'N' Roses, Glenn Hughes, Paul Gilbert, and Ike & Tina Turner. A cover by the band Favorite Angel would peak at number 69 on the Hot 100 in September 1990.

References

Further reading

External links
 

1975 singles
RPM Top Singles number-one singles
Songs written by Alice Cooper
Songs written by Dick Wagner
Alice Cooper songs
Song recordings produced by Bob Ezrin
1970s ballads
Rock ballads
1975 songs
Atlantic Records singles
American soft rock songs
Songs about domestic violence